Thatcheriasyrinx orientis is a species of sea snail, a marine gastropod mollusk in the family Raphitomidae.

Subspecies 
 Thatcheriasyrinx orientis kawamurai (Kuroda, 1959) (found off the Ogasawara Islands, Japan)

Description
The length of the shell attains 9.5 mm, its diameter 4 mm.

Distribution
This marine species occurs in the Red Sea, the Persian Gulf andf the Gulf of Oman;  and off Hawaii (this is probably a species of Aliceia)

References

 Chino, M. & Stahlschmidt, P. (2021). Description of a new Famelica species (Gastropoda: Raphitomidae) from the Philippines. Gloria Maris. 60(4): 184-187.

External links
 Melvill, Descriptions of twenty-three species of Gastropoda from the Persian Gulf, Gulf of Oman, and Arabian Sea; Proceedings of the Malacological Society of London v. 6 (1904-1905)

orientis
Gastropods described in 1904